Industrial dye degradation is any of a number of processed by which dyes are broken down, ideally into innocuous products.  Many dyes, specifically in the textile industry such as methylene blue or methyl red, are released into ecosystems through water waste. Many of these dyes can be carcinogenic. In paper recycling dyes can be removed from fibres during a deinking stage prior to degradation.

Methods 
 Heterogeneous photocataylsis is one approach to the degradation of dyes.

As applied to dye-containing effluents from the textile industry, several approaches are standardized for removal or degradation of dyes.  These include oxidation, e.g. using air or hydrogen peroxide, ozone, or Fenton chemistry.  One challenge is that oxidants can be indiscriminent such that large amounts of reagents can be required (see Chemical oxygen demand).  One promising approach combines oxidation with photocatalysis.  Reduction is also employed, a standard reagent being dithionite, which traditionally affords leuco dyes.  Precipitation, often coupled with flocculation, is yet another approach, although it can produce substantial quantities of solids.

References 

Dyes
Pollution control technologies